Group 9 consisted of three of the 32 teams entered into the European zone: France, Republic of Ireland, and Soviet Union. These three teams competed on a home-and-away basis with the group's winner advancing to the UEFA–CONMEBOL play-off with the winner of the play-off earning a place in the final tournament.

Standings

Matches

Notes

External links 
Group 9 Detailed Results at RSSSF

9
1972–73 in French football
1973–74 in French football
1972–73 in Republic of Ireland association football
1973–74 in Republic of Ireland association football
1972 in Soviet football
1973 in Soviet football